Georgi Hristov (Macedonian: Ѓорѓи Христов, also romanized as Gjorgji Hristov; born 30 January 1976) is a Macedonian former professional footballer who played as a striker.

Hristov made 48 appearances and netted 18 goals for Macedonia between 1995 and 2005, being the second-highest scorer in the country's history.

Club career
Born in Bitola, Hristov started out with his hometown club Pelister, before transferring to Partizan in 1994. He spent the following three seasons with the Black-Whites, winning back-to-back championships in 1996 and 1997. In June 1997, Hristov was sold to English club Barnsley for a fee of £1.5 million. He scored 8 league goals in his debut season with the Tykes, as the club suffered relegation from the Premiership. In the following two years, Hristov missed a lot of games due to a knee injury, before eventually leaving the club in 2000. He subsequently joined Dutch club NEC Nijmegen. He moved to fellow Eredivisie side FC Zwolle in summer 2003.

International career
Hristov was capped 48 times for Macedonia, netting a goal on his debut in a 2–2 draw against Armenia on 10 May 1995. He scored a total of 16 goals for the national team, making him the second-highest scorer in the history of Macedonian football, only behind Goran Pandev. His final international was a March 2005 FIFA World Cup qualification match against the Netherlands.

Managerial career
In October 2011, Hristov was appointed manager of Metalurg Skopje. He was released by the club in late 2012.

Career statistics

Honours
Partizan
 First League of FR Yugoslavia: 1995–96, 1996–97

References

External links
 Profile at MacedonianFootball.com 
 
 
 

1976 births
Living people
Sportspeople from Bitola
Association football forwards
Macedonian footballers
North Macedonia international footballers
FK Partizan players
Barnsley F.C. players
NEC Nijmegen players
PEC Zwolle players
Dunfermline Athletic F.C. players
Debreceni VSC players
Hapoel Nof HaGalil F.C. players
Niki Volos F.C. players
Olympiakos Nicosia players
FC Den Bosch players
FC Baku players
JJK Jyväskylä players
Macedonian First Football League players
First League of Serbia and Montenegro players
Premier League players
English Football League players
Eredivisie players
Scottish Premier League players
Nemzeti Bajnokság I players
Israeli Premier League players
Cypriot First Division players
Eerste Divisie players
Azerbaijan Premier League players
Veikkausliiga players
Macedonian expatriate footballers
Expatriate footballers in Serbia and Montenegro
Macedonian expatriate sportspeople in Serbia and Montenegro
Expatriate footballers in England
Macedonian expatriate sportspeople in England
Expatriate footballers in the Netherlands
Macedonian expatriate sportspeople in the Netherlands
Expatriate footballers in Scotland
Expatriate footballers in Hungary
Macedonian expatriate sportspeople in Hungary
Expatriate footballers in Israel
Macedonian expatriate sportspeople in Israel
Expatriate footballers in Greece
Macedonian expatriate sportspeople in Greece
Expatriate footballers in Cyprus
Macedonian expatriate sportspeople in Cyprus
Expatriate footballers in Azerbaijan
Macedonian expatriate sportspeople in Azerbaijan
Expatriate footballers in Finland
Macedonian expatriate sportspeople in Finland
Macedonian football managers
FK Metalurg Skopje managers